Martin Lynes (born 12 July 1967) is an Australian actor.

Career
Lynes is known for his work as Dr. Luke Forlano on All Saints, an Australian hospital drama. On the series he tried many times to become the Chief medical officer but failed. He was primarily a surgeon but spent time helping in ward 17. He has also played Rick Gallager in Sea Patrol. Lynes then played Coach Simmo who ran the surf academy Solar Blue for budding pro surfers in Blue Water High, shown on ABC Australia. Lynes has also had roles in the now defunct McLeod's Daughters and as the head of an advertising company in the popular TV drama Packed to the Rafters.

Lynes joined the cast of Home and Away in 2012 as villain Adam Sharpe.

Post acting career
Currently, Lynes lives on the Central Coast of NSW and works as a Real Estate Agent, for the agency Property Central Long Jetty.

In August 2017 he was found guilty of sexual assault. He received a custodial sentence of 5 years

Filmography

References

External life
 

1967 births
20th-century Australian male actors
21st-century Australian male actors
21st-century Australian criminals
Australian male television actors
People convicted of sexual assault
Living people
Prisoners and detainees of New South Wales